Drive By was a New Jersey based music group that  toured nationally and internationally since 2004 after the release of their debut album I Hate Every Day Without You Kid... After three years of touring in support of the album, they released a new record, title A Delicate Situation, on April 8, 2008. Delicate Situation reached #26 on the Billboard Heatseekers chart. Lead Singer/Guitar player Todd Price has covered for Frank Iero of My Chemical Romance on several tours.  The band is signed to Riot Squad Records and Riot Squad Management, a management company that also works with My Chemical Romance, Circa Survive, Endless Hallway and Fever Club.

Drive By has been covered in notable press formats such as Spin magazine, and opened for My Chemical Romance and Billy Talent on My Chemical Romance's 2008 North American Tour. The group split in the middle of 2010.

Members
Todd Price - vocals/guitar
Daniel Fitzgerald - guitar
Jaeson Hertzberg - drums
Chris Perino - bass

Past members
Manny Felix - guitar

Discography

"I Hate Every Day Without You Kid..." (released in May 2006)

"A Delicate Situation" (released April 8, 2008)

Notes

External links
 Drive By Official Website
 Drive By on Myspace
 Dan Fitzgerald's Tour Blog

Musical groups from New Jersey
Musical groups established in 2004